Vespasian's Camp is an Iron Age hillfort just west of the town of Amesbury, Wiltshire, England. The site is a scheduled monument and lies within the boundaries of the Stonehenge World Heritage Site. 

Other hillforts nearby include Danebury to the east, Sidbury Hill and Casterley Camp to the north, Yarnbury Castle to the west and Figsbury Ring and Old Sarum to the south. Ogbury Camp,  to the south, may have been a satellite enclosure of Vespasian's Camp.

Toponym
The earthworks were named "Vespasian's Camp" in the 16th century by William Camden, an Elizabethan antiquarian and historian, during a tour of the area. Although the Roman general Vespasian, who was later Roman emperor from 69 to 79 CE, campaigned through Wessex after the Roman invasion of Britain in 43 CE, there is no evidence to suggest he came to this hillfort or had any military base here.

Description

It occupies a strong defensive position. There are two original entrances, one on the north and the other probably to the southeast, just north of the point where Stonehenge Road cuts through the camp.

A road constructed over the hilltop in the Middle Ages separates the southern part of the site from the rest of the hillfort. During the 18th century, the hillfort was landscaped as part of the Duke of Queensbury's grounds around Amesbury Abbey. A grotto, vista and paths were constructed and substantial tree planting was carried out. The A303 road was cut through the northern section of the hill in the 1970s, just below the northernmost bank.

Archaeological research

During road-widening in 1964, the main western rampart was partly uncovered. It had been assumed that most of the archaeology had been lost during the 18th-century landscaping of the area by Charles Bridgeman and others for the Duke of Queensberry. However, documentary research showed that the hillfort had escaped most of the landscaping, and excavations began in 2005, concentrating on an area just northeast of Vespasian's Camp known as Blick Mead.

The first finds were tools ranging as far back as the Mesolithic. What had been thought to be a water feature was an ancient spring which might have been part of a seasonal lake. There is a one metre (40-inch) thick layer of domestic waste that suggests the hill had a considerable population after the banks were constructed. Occupation of the site spanned the period from 6250 to 4700 BCE, as indicated by the Neolithic pits found near the centre. It has been suggested that the hill may have been part of the Stonehenge ritual landscape during the later part of this period.

Further work in 2010 uncovered a  layer of Mesolithic material including 10,000 pieces of struck flint and over 300 pieces of animal bone, a find described by Professor Tim Darvill as "the most important discovery at Stonehenge in many years". The struck flint tools were in pristine condition, sharp enough to cut the fingers of some of the excavators, and it is believed that the layer may extend several hundred metres further. The archaeologist Carly Hilts states:

One tool was made out of worked slate, a material not found in the area. A possible source could be a slate glacial erratic, though there are none known to exist in the vicinity; or the slate could have been carried from the nearest source in North Wales. If this is the source it implies that, hundreds of years before Stonehenge, this may have been a "special place to gather". Evidence suggests that the area around the spring was used for large feasts, including the consumption of aurochs, and as a centre for tool-making. An unusual form of Mesolithic domestic site was also found: a semi-permanent site for families called a "homebase".

UNESCO World Heritage Site

Stonehenge, Avebury and Associated Sites is a UNESCO World Heritage Site (WHS) located in Wiltshire, England. The sites were inscribed as co-listings in 1986. A number of large and well known monuments lie within the WHS, but the area also has an exceptionally high density of small-scale archaeological sites, particularly from the prehistoric period. More than 700 individual archaeological features have been identified. There are 160 separate scheduled monuments, covering 415 items or features. Vespasian's Camp lies near the eastern boundary of the southern section of the site.

Notes

Citations

Bibliography

External links
 English Heritage geophysical survey
 Amesbury Excavation – Open University
 Discoveries at Vespasian’s Camp, near Stonehenge, Wiltshire, 2005–12
 Historic England Research digital magazine issue 6, "Vespasian's Camp" pp 29–33 – article by Mark Bowden
 Mark Bowden, 2016: Stonehenge Southern WHS project: Vespasian's Camp, Amesbury Wiltshire: Analytical Earthwork Survey, Report Number 49/2017

Sites associated with Stonehenge
Stone Age sites in England
Bronze Age sites in England
Iron Age sites in England
Hill forts in Wiltshire
World Heritage Sites in England
History of Wiltshire
Buildings and structures in Wiltshire
Archaeological sites in Wiltshire